This is a list of the members of the Dewan Rakyat (House of Representatives) of the 3rd Parliament of Malaysia, elected in 1969. From 1969 to 1971, the National Operations Council governed the country in lieu of the elected government. In 1971, the NOC was dissolved with the restoration of Third Parliament of Malaysia.

Composition

Elected members by state


Unless noted otherwise, the MPs served the entire term of the parliament (from 20 February 1971 until 31 July 1974).

Perlis

Kedah

Kelantan

Trengganu

Penang

Perak

Pahang

Selangor

Negri Sembilan

Malacca

Johore

Sabah

Sarawak

Notes

References

Abdullah, Z. G., Adnan, H. N., & Lee, K. H. (1997). Malaysia, tokoh dulu dan kini = Malaysian personalities, past and present. Kuala Lumpur, Malaysia: Penerbit Universiti Malaya.
Anzagain Sdn. Bhd. (2004). Almanak keputusan pilihan raya umum: Parlimen & Dewan Undangan Negeri, 1959-1999. Shah Alam, Selangor: Anzagain.
Chin, U.-H. (1996). Chinese politics in Sarawak: A study of the Sarawak United People's Party. Kuala Lumpur: Oxford University Press.
Faisal, S. H. (2012). Domination and Contestation: Muslim Bumiputera Politics in Sarawak. Institute of Southeast Asian Studies.
Hussain, M. (1987). Membangun demokrasi: Pilihanraya di Malaysia. Kuala Lumpur: Karya Bistari.
Ibnu, H. (1993). PAS kuasai Malaysia?: 1950-2000 sejarah kebangkitan dan masa depan. Kuala Lumpur: GG Edar.
Surohanjaya Pilehanraya Malaysia. (1972). Penyata pilehanraya umum Dewan Raʻayat dan Dewan Undangan Negeri bagi Negeri² Tanah Melayu, Sabah dan Sarawak, tahun 1969. Kuala Lumpur: Jabatan Chetak Kerajaan. 
Vasil, R. K. (1972). The Malaysian general election of 1969. Singapore: Oxford University Press.

Malaysian parliaments
Lists of members of the Dewan Rakyat